Der Eugen is a German television series. It was produced by Süddeutscher Rundfunk Stuttgart. The eight-minute episodes were broadcast between commercial breaks in ARD's regional early evening program starting in 1986.

See also
List of German television series

External links
 

1986 German television series debuts
1990 German television series endings
Television series about wine
German-language television shows
Das Erste original programming